Whitfield is a surname of Old English and Anglo-Saxon origins deriving from hwit (white or chalky) and feld (open lands). It can also be an Americanized or Anglicised form of the German and Ashkenazi Jewish surname Weissfeld, composed of the elements weiss 'white' and feld 'field'. 

Persons with the surname include:
 Allan George Williams Whitfield (1909–1987), English physician
 Andrew Whitfield (politician) (born 1982), South African politician
 Andrew Carnegie Whitfield (born 1910), nephew of steel magnate Andrew Carnegie who disappeared in New York in 1938
 Andy Whitfield (1971–2011), Welsh-Australian actor
 Anne Whitfield, American actress
 Arthur Whitfield (1868–1947), English physician and professor of medicine
 Barrence Whitfield (born 1955), American soul and R&B vocalist and bandleader
 Bob Whitfield (born 1971), American football player
 Brent Whitfield (born 1981), American soccer player
 Charles Whitfield (disambiguation)
 David Whitfield (1925–1980), British singer
 Dondré Whitfield (born 1969), American actor
 Dwayne Whitfield (born 1972), American basketball player
 Ed Whitfield (born 1943), American politician
 Evan Whitfield (born 1977), American soccer player 
 Fred Whitfield (1938–2013), American baseball player
 Fred Whitfield (rodeo) (born 1967), American calf roper
 Fredricka Whitfield (born 1965), American news anchor
 Henry L. Whitfield (1868–1927), American politician and Mississippi governor
 Jack Whitfield (1892–1927), Welsh rugby union player
 James Whitfield (disambiguation)
 John Whitfield (disambiguation)
 June Whitfield (1925–2018), English comedy actress
 Ken Whitfield (1930–1995),  English footballer
 Kermit Whitfield (born 1993), American football player
 Lynn Whitfield (born 1953), American actress
 Mark Whitfield (born 1967), American jazz guitarist
 Martin Whitfield (born 1965), Scottish politician
 Mal Whitfield (1924–2015), American track athlete
 Mitchell Whitfield (born 1964), American actor
 Norman Whitfield (1940–2008), American songwriter and producer
 Norman Whitfield (footballer) (1896–1962), English footballer
 Robert Parr Whitfield (1828-1910), American paleontologist
 Shelby Whitfield (1935–2013), American sportscaster
 Simon Whitfield (born 1975), Canadian triathlon athlete
 Stephen Whitfield (disambiguation)
 Thomas Whitfield (disambiguation)
 Terry Whitfield (born 1953), American baseball player
 Trent Whitfield (born 1977), Canadian ice hockey player
 Vantile Whitfield (1930–2005), American arts administrator
 Wesla Whitfield (1947–2018), American singer
 Wilf Whitfield (1916–1995), English footballer
 Havilyn Whitfield
(born, 2004), American Professional Graphic Artist

See also
 General Whitfield (disambiguation)
 Governor Whitfield (disambiguation)
 Justice Whitfield (disambiguation)
 William Henry Whitfeld (1856–1915), English mathematician
 Whitfield (disambiguation)
 Whitefield (disambiguation), sometimes spelled Whitfield

References

English-language surnames